Indian Institute for Aeronautical Engineering & Information Technology (IIAEIT) is an aerospace engineering college in Pune, India. It also offers mechanical engineering and other technology related courses. It is known for its full-time face to face B.Tech Aerospace Engineering course (BTAE) which is jointly launched by D.Y Patil University and Aeronautical Engineering and Research Organisation (AERO).

It is a frontline training institute in the engineering disciplines, especially in the field of aeronautics. With a first rated faculty, backed by fully furnished laboratories, the institute is considered as the one of the best in Pune, India.

IIAEIT has established itself into a chief forefront Institution with excellent infrastructure over the last twelve years. Apart from training students for the professional industries, the institution also prepares Aerospace students to master their engineering.

History

AERO
Aeronautical Engineering and Research Organisation (AERO) is a constituent part of Shastri Group of Institutes. It popularizes education, research and development by collaborating with several Industries and educational institutions in all fields of aviation in India as well as abroad. AERO offers B.Tech aerospace engineering course which is accomplished face-to-face.

Shastri campus
Shastri Group of Institutes was founded in [(pune)[India]] by Anshul Sharma in the year 2001. The group originated by preparing students for the examinations conducted by professional institutes. With its front head flagship named Indian Institute for Aeronautical Engineering and Information Technology 
SGI is a part of PSD Shastri Educational Foundation which is engaged in several social services and objectives. It is mentored by an Advisory Board whose members are from Aviation, Services, Industries, Business and Educational fields.

Aerospace course
B.Tech Aerospace Engineering (BTAE) is run by IIAEIT as a Program Study Center of Indira Gandhi National Open University, in face-face mode of delivery in India's education hub, Pune . It is a four-year full-time degree course. AERO has designed this four-year full-time course and IIAEIT conducts the lectures and practicals. Some technical subjects are taught by guest lecturers from Delhi via teleconferencing facilitated by IGNOU.

The curriculum includes a total of 19 laboratory courses. A one-year project assessment in the seventh semester and eight elective courses in the final semester, industry visit in two semesters and professional training is must for all admitted students. The course offers 120 seats per centre.

Presently fresh admissions are kept on hold till further orders by the court.

Credit scheme
The total percentage of marks are calculated for each semester by summing the products of marks obtained in each subject and its respective credits and then dividing it by the total credits.

References

External links
 

Aeronautics organizations
Engineering colleges in Pune
Educational institutions established in 2001
2001 establishments in Maharashtra